Stjørna is a former municipality in the old Sør-Trøndelag county in Norway. The municipality existed from 1899 until its dissolution in 1964. The  municipality encompassed the land surrounding the Stjørnfjorden in what is now the municipalities of Ørland and Indre Fosen in Trøndelag county. The administrative centre of Stjørna was the village of Husbysjøen. The municipality of Stjørna also included the villages of Høybakken, Råkvåg, and Fevåg. The main church for the municipality was Stjørna Church which is now called Heggvik Church.

History
The municipality of Skjørn was established on 1 January 1899 when the old municipality of Bjugn was split into three separate municipalities: Bjugn (population: 1,256), Skjørn (population: 2,166), and Nes (population: 1,285). In 1918, the spelling of the name was changed from Skjørn to Stjørna.

During the 1960s, there were many municipal mergers across Norway due to the work of the Schei Committee. On 1 January 1964, the northern part of the municipality (Nord-Stjørna) (population: 676) was merged with the neighboring municipalities of Bjugn (population: 1,240), Nes (population: 1,107), and Jøssund (population: 1,917) to form a new, larger municipality of Bjugn. The southern part of Stjørna municipality (Sør-Stjørna) (population: 1,868) was merged with the neighboring municipality of Rissa (population: 3,264) and most of the municipality of Stadsbygd (population: 1,616) to form a new, larger municipality of Rissa.

Government

The municipal council  of Stjørna was made up of representatives that were elected to four year terms. The party breakdown of the final municipal council was as follows:

See also
List of former municipalities of Norway

References

Former municipalities of Norway
Ørland
Indre Fosen
1899 establishments in Norway
1964 disestablishments in Norway